The Vixens of Kung Fu (A Tale of Yin Yang) is a 1975 American pornographic martial arts exploitation film produced and directed by Bill Milling, under the pseudonym Chiang. It stars Bree Anthony, Tony Richards, Peonies Jong, and C. J. Laing, and follows a prostitute who is gang raped, and who seeks revenge against her rapists after being trained in kung fu with a clan of other women by a martial artist. The film received an X rating from the Motion Picture Association of America.

Cast
 Bree Anthony as Prostitute (credited as Brie Anthony)
 Tony Richards as Monk (as Tony Blue)
 Peonies Jong as Ha Tien Sau (as Peonies Jung)
 C. J. Laing as Kung Fu Teacher
 Jamie Gillis as Hunter
 Bobby Astyr as Hunter
 Lin Chen Fu as Chao Tzu

Critical reception
Brian Orndorf of Blu-ray.com called the film "a jarring viewing experience", and wrote that it "has no substance or dramatics, just a random assortment of poses from actors who don't have martial arts training". He concluded: "It should be fun, but it's a little too dark for comfort, with sex scenes more about domination than pleasure [...] It's all a big goof, and one that could use 100% less rape to be taken seriously as something light."

Home media
In July 2013, The Vixens of Kung Fu was released on DVD by Vinegar Syndrome as a double feature with another 1975 film, Oriental Blue, also directed by Bill Milling. In 2018, Vinegar Syndrome released the film on Blu-ray as part of a five-disc collection titled 5 Films 5 Years - Volume #3.

References

External links
 

1970s exploitation films
1970s pornographic films
1975 martial arts films
1975 films
American exploitation films
American martial arts films
American pornographic films
American films about revenge
Kung fu films
American rape and revenge films
American sexploitation films
1970s English-language films
1970s American films